Erica Joan Kershaw (born 23 December 1991) is an Australian cricketer who plays as a wicket-keeper and left-handed batter. She has played for Victoria, Melbourne Renegades, ACT Meteors, Hobart Hurricanes. She made her maiden WNCL fifty on 24 September 2019, scoring 52 in ACT's three-wicket win over the South Australian Scorpions.

References

External links

Erica Kershaw at Cricket Australia

1991 births
Living people
People from Castlemaine, Victoria
Sportswomen from Victoria (Australia)
Cricketers from Victoria (Australia)
Australian women cricketers
ACT Meteors cricketers
Hobart Hurricanes (WBBL) cricketers
Melbourne Renegades (WBBL) cricketers
Victoria women cricketers